Manfred Liebenau (16 September 1893 – 13 June 1958), known professionally as Erik Lund, was a German film director and producer of the silent era. He was married to the actress Eva May.

Selected filmography
 Sadja (1918)
 The Foolish Heart (1919)
 The Last Sun Son (1919)
 Between Two Worlds (1919)
 Black Pearls (1919)
 The Fairy of Saint Ménard (1919)
 The Bride of the Incapacitated (1919)
 The World Champion (1919)
 Irrlicht (1919)
 The Golden Lie (1919)
 The Heart of Casanova (1919)
 A Man's Word (1919)
 Devoted Artists (1919)
 All Souls (1919)
 The Bodega of Los Cuerros (1919)
 Only a Servant (1919)
 State Attorney Jordan (1919)
 The Enchanted Princess (1919)
 In the Whirl of Life (1920)
 President Barrada (1920)
 Forbidden Love (1920)
 Alfred von Ingelheim's Dramatic Life (1921)
 The Secret of Castle Ronay (1922)
 Dagfin (1926), Production manager
 Die große Attraktion (1931), Production manager

References

Bibliography
 Ruth Barton. Hedy Lamarr: The Most Beautiful Woman in Film. University Press of Kentucky, 2010.

External links

1893 births
1958 deaths
Film people from Berlin
German emigrants to the United States